is a Japanese actress and model.

Monō did spots for, amongst others, Nike, before Hiroyuki Nakano caught sight of her in a video clip and cast her in Samurai Fiction, her film debut. She has since worked with Nakano in his Stereo Future and the short film Slow is Beautiful.

Filmography
Samurai Fiction (1998)
Stereo Future (2001)
Kakuto (2003)
Lost in Translation (2005)
Colors (2006)
Youkai Kidan (2007)
Baumkuchen (2007)
Konna Otonano Onnanoko (2007)
United Red Army (2007)
Anna No Monogatari (2007)
After School (2008)
Heaven's Door (2009)
The Code/Angou (2009)
Yatterman (2009)
Tetsuo: The Bullet Man (2010)
Ugly (2011)

References

External links
 
 Akiko Monou's JMDb Listing (in Japanese)

1976 births
Living people
Japanese actresses
Japanese female models